Linden Wiesman (born January 23, 1975, in Columbia, Tennessee) is an American equestrian. She won a bronze medal in team  eventing at the 2000 Summer Olympics in Sydney, together with Karen O'Connor, David O'Connor and Nina Fout.

References

External links 
 

1975 births
Living people
American female equestrians
Olympic bronze medalists for the United States in equestrian
Equestrians at the 2000 Summer Olympics
People from Columbia, Tennessee
Medalists at the 2000 Summer Olympics
21st-century American women